The Jamaica Classic was a golf tournament on the LPGA Tour from 1989 to 1991. It was played at the Tryall Golf Club in Jamaica.

Winners
1991 Jane Geddes
1990 Patty Sheehan
1989 Betsy King

References

Former LPGA Tour events
Golf tournaments in Jamaica
Women's sport in Jamaica
Recurring sporting events established in 1989
Recurring sporting events disestablished in 1991
1989 establishments in Jamaica
1991 disestablishments in Jamaica